is a passenger railway station in located in the city of Higashiōsaka,  Osaka Prefecture, Japan, operated by the private railway operator Kintetsu Railway.

Lines
Hyōtan-yama Station is served by the Nara Line, and is located 7.0 rail kilometers from the starting point of the line at Fuse Station and 13.1 kilometers from Ōsaka Namba Station.

Station layout
The station consists of two opposed side platforms, connected by an elevated station building.

Platforms

Adjacent stations

History
Hyōtan-yama Station opened on April 30, 1914 as a station of Osaka Electric Tramway. In 1941 it was transferred to the Kansai Kyūkō Railway, which became part of Kintetsu in 1944.

Passenger statistics
In fiscal 2018, the station was used by an average of 21,783 passengers daily.

Surrounding area
Osaka Prefectural Hiraoka Hirafu High School
Higashi Osaka Municipal Nawate Kita Elementary School
 Higashi Osaka City Asahimachi Government Building

See also
List of railway stations in Japan

References

External links

 Hyōtan-yama Station 

Railway stations in Japan opened in 1914
Railway stations in Osaka Prefecture
Higashiōsaka